Badhwabara railway station is a railway station on Bilaspur–Katni line under Bilaspur railway division of South East Central Railway Zone of Indian Railways. The railway station is situated beside National Highway 43 at Badhwabara in Shahdol district in the Indian state of Madhya Pradesh.

History
Katni to Umaria railway line was constructed in 1886 as Katni–Umaria Provincial State Railway and in 1891 the line was extended to Bilaspur Junction by Bengal Nagpur Railway.

References

Railway stations in Shahdol district
Bilaspur railway division